Ruhunu Kumari  (Princess of "Ruhuna" - southern province) (Tamil: உருகுண இளவரசி) is a daytime passenger train that runs between Colombo and Matara in Sri Lanka.

The Matara-bound train departs from Colombo at 3.50 p.m., while the Colombo-bound train leaves Matara at 6.05 a.m. The trip takes about 2.45 hours.

Services

The train offers two classes
Second class is more comfortable than the third class.
Third class typically gets very crowded with commuters, And provide only the basic facilities.

Route

The Ruhunu Kumari travels the length of Sri Lanka Railways' Coastal Line through the south-west coast of Sri Lanka, from Colombo-Fort to Matara.

The Ruhunu Kumari begins her southbound journey at Maradana station and goes to Fort Railway Station, the primary railway station in Colombo.  Then she passes stations at Slave Island, Kollupitiya, Bambalapitiya, and Wellawattha, all situated within Colombo city.  Then she passes the rapidly growing cities of Dehiwala-Mount Lavinia, Ratmalana, and Moratuwa.

As she enters Kalutara district, passing the Colombo district, Egoda Uyana, Panadura, Pinwattha and Wadduwa are the foremost stations.  The train calls at both of Kalutara's stations, Kalutara north and Kalutara south.  Next the Ruhunu Kumari passes Katukurunda, the site of Sri Lanka's first railway accident.  Payagala north and Payagala south which are the stations of Payagala city are also situated in this line.  After Maggona, Beruwala, Hettimulla and Aluthgama stations Ruhunu Kumari enters the Galle district. Bentota, a very popular tourist destination, is the first station situated in Galle district on this line.  Induruwa, Kosgoda, Ahungalla, Balapitiya, Ambalangoda, Kahawa, Hikkaduwa, Dodanduwa, Rajgama, Boossa, Gintota are the main stations situated before Galle.  Next the Ruhunu Kumari arrives at Galle station.

Next, the Ruhunu Kumari starts her journey on the Galle-Matara line. The train has to back out of Galle station, due to its terminal-station layout.  Katugoda is the first station on the line towards Matara.  Unawatuna, Talpe, Habaraduwa, Koggala, Kataluwa and Ahangama are the last stations in Galle district.  Midigama, Kumbalgama, Weligama are the foremost stations in the Matara. Polwathumodara, Mirissa, Kamburugamuwa, and Walgama are the next stations.  Finally Ruhunu Kumari has come to her destination: Matara.

References

External links 
 
 

Named passenger trains of Sri Lanka